Mimagelasta grisescens is a species of beetle in the family Cerambycidae, and the only species in the genus Mimagelasta. It was described by Stephan von Breuning in 1939.

References

Mesosini
Beetles described in 1939